Kim Tae-hoon (born May 26, 1975) is a South Korean actor. Kim graduated from Hanyang University, then began his acting career with the Hanyang Repertory Theatre in 1997. Onscreen, he has played leading roles in indie films such as Way to Go, Rose (2006), The Pit and the Pendulum (2009) and When Winter Screams (2013). Kim also stars in mainstream films and television dramas such as The Man from Nowhere (2010), You're So Pretty (2011), The Innocent Man (2012), An Ethics Lesson (2013), and Pure Love (2013).

His older brother Kim Tae-woo is also an actor.

Filmography

Film

Television series

Web series

Hosting

Theater

Awards and nominations

References

External links 
 Kim Tae-hoon at JYP Entertainment 
 Kim Tae-hoon Fan Cafe at Daum 
 
 
 
 
 
 

1975 births
Living people
South Korean male film actors
South Korean male television actors
South Korean male stage actors
South Korean male musical theatre actors
Hanyang University alumni
21st-century South Korean male actors